Horacio Piña García [pee'-nyah] (born March 12, 1945) is a Mexican former relief pitcher who played in Major League Baseball over eight seasons between  and . Piña also played professionally in Mexico for all or portions of nine years.

Piña reached the major leagues in 1968 with the Cleveland Indians, spending two years with them before moving to the Washington Senators/Texas Rangers (–), Oakland Athletics, Chicago Cubs, California Angels and Philadelphia Phillies. His most productive season came in 1972 with the last-place Rangers, when he posted career-numbers in saves (15), strikeouts (60) and games pitched (60). Traded to the Oakland Athletics for Mike Epstein on December 1, 1972, he responded with a 6–3 mark, eight saves and career-highs in ERA (2.76) and innings (88.0), helping them to clinch the ALCS and the World Series Championship. He was dealt from the Athletics to the Cubs for Bob Locker at the Winter Meetings on December 3, 1973. In an eight-season career, Piña posted a 23–23 record with a 3.25 ERA and 38 saves in 314 games. In three post-season games he had a perfect 0.00 ERA in five innings.

As a pitcher in the Mexican League, Piña threw a no-hitter in 1975 and a perfect game in 1978 while posting a 21–4 record with a 1.94 ERA that year. Piña gained induction in the Mexican Professional Baseball Hall of Fame in 1988.

See also
Players from Mexico in MLB

References

The ESPN Baseball Encyclopedia – Gary Gillette, Peter Gammons, Pete Palmer. Publisher: Sterling Publishing, 2005. Format: Paperback, 1824pp. Language: English.

External links

Horacio Piña - Baseball Biography
Salón de la Fama del Béisbol de México (Spanish)

1945 births
Living people
Baseball players from Coahuila
California Angels players
Chicago Cubs players
Cleveland Indians players
Leones de Yucatán players
Major League Baseball pitchers
Major League Baseball players from Mexico
Mexican Baseball Hall of Fame inductees
Mexican expatriate baseball players in the United States
Oakland Athletics players
Pericos de Puebla players
Philadelphia Phillies players
Portland Beavers players
Rieleros de Aguascalientes players
Reno Silver Sox players
Texas Rangers players
Washington Senators (1961–1971) players